Taleb Nematpour (born 19 September 1984 in Koohdasht, Iran) is an Iranian wrestler. In 2014, he was banned for life for doping, with the substance epi-trenbolone.

References

Living people
Asian Games gold medalists for Iran
Islamic Azad University, Central Tehran Branch alumni
Asian Games medalists in wrestling
Wrestlers at the 2010 Asian Games
Iranian sportspeople in doping cases
1984 births
Doping cases in wrestling
World Wrestling Championships medalists
Iranian male sport wrestlers
Medalists at the 2010 Asian Games
People from Kuhdasht
World Wrestling Champions
20th-century Iranian people
21st-century Iranian people